Lactococcus virus P008 is a phage specific to Lactococcus lactis, a lactic acid bacteria used in the first stage of making cheese. P008 and related species are responsible for important loss each year in cheese factories.

References

Bacteriophages